Sullivan Peaks is a pair of sharp peaks in Antarctica, over 1,400 m, on a spur descending from Pierce Peak on the north side of Mackin Table, in the Patuxent Range, Pensacola Mountains. They were mapped by the United States Geological Survey (USGS) from surveys and U.S. Navy air photos from 1956 to 1966. They were named by the Advisory Committee on Antarctic Names (US-ACAN) for Lieutenant Ronald C. Sullivan of the U.S. Navy, who was the officer in charge of the South Pole Station during the winter of 1967.

Mountains of Queen Elizabeth Land
Pensacola Mountains